Maspro Denkoh is a Japanese electronics manufacturer.

In 2005, the firm chose the auctioneer of their $20 million art collection through a game of rock, paper, scissors. Christie's won.

References

External links
Maspro Denkoh (en)alternative site

Electronics companies of Japan
Companies based in Aichi Prefecture
Electronics companies established in 1955
Japanese brands
Companies listed on the Tokyo Stock Exchange
1955 establishments in Japan